Hayley Westenra is the debut published studio album of Hayley Westenra and her first album for the label Universal New Zealand. This album was released only in New Zealand and Australia. The last two tracks were released on special editions of the disk – the other editions do not include these tracks. It was published by the Universal New Zealand label in 2001.

The album was a commercial success in New Zealand, being certified Gold in its first week and topping the New Zealand Album Chart for four weeks.

Track listing

Bonus Tracks

References

Hayley Westenra albums
2001 albums